Harvard is a town in Worcester County, Massachusetts, United States. The town is located 25 miles west-northwest of Boston, in eastern Massachusetts. A farming community settled in 1658 and incorporated in 1732, it has been home to several non-traditional communities, such as Harvard Shaker Village and the utopian transcendentalist center Fruitlands. It is also home to St. Benedict Abbey, a traditional Catholic monastery. It is a residential town noted for its public schools, with its students ranking high in the state's English and math examinations. The population was 6,851 at the 2020 census. The official seal of the town depicts the old town public library on The Common prior to renovations that removed the front steps.

History
Europeans first settled in what later became Harvard in the 17th century, along a road connecting Lancaster with Groton that was formally laid out in 1658. There were few inhabitants until after King Philip's War, in which Groton and Lancaster were attacked and substantially destroyed. Over the next 50 years the population grew until it had reached a point adequate to support a church. A new town including parts of Lancaster, Groton, and Stow was incorporated in 1732, subject to the proviso that the inhabitants "Settle a learned and Orthodox Minister among them within the space of two years and also erect an House for the publick Worship of God."  It is uncertain how the town obtained its name, though the Willard family, among the first settlers and the largest proprietors in the new town, had several connections to Harvard College. According to The Harvard Crimson, Josiah Willard named the town after Harvard College, where he had attended, because the articles of incorporation had left the town unnamed. The first minister was Rev. John Seccombe, serving from 1733 to 1757.

In 1734, the town was considered to have five districts or villages. These were Oak Hill, Bare Hill, Still River, Old Mill, and Shabikin, present day Devens.

One notable early enterprise based in Harvard was the Benjamin Ball Pencil Company, which produced some of the first writing instruments made in the United States. They operated in the Old Mill district from 1830 to 1860. Despite this and other limited manufacturing, the town economy was primarily based on agriculture until the middle of the 20th century. This past is most prominently visible in the number of apple orchards. These apple orchards produce many apple products every year the most notable being apple cider. It is now mostly a residential "bedroom community" for workers at companies in Boston and its suburbs. Harvard has had a relatively quiet history, but has attracted several "non-traditional" communities that have given its history some flavor.

The Shakers

One part of town is the site of Harvard Shaker Village, where a utopian religious community was established. During a period of religious dissent, a number of Harvard residents, led by Shadrack Ireland, abandoned the Protestant church in Harvard. In 1769, they built a house that later became known as the Square House. Not long after Ireland's death in 1778, the Shaker Founder Mother Ann Lee met with this group in 1781 and the group joined her United Society of Believers in Christ's Second Appearing, or Shakers.

It was the first Shaker settlement in Massachusetts and the second settlement in the United States. The Harvard Shaker Village Historic District is located in the vicinity of Shaker Road, South Shaker Road, and Maple Lane. At its largest, the Shakers owned about 2,000 acres of land in Harvard. By 1890, the Harvard community had dwindled to less than 40, from a peak of about 200 in the 1850s. In 1917 the Harvard Shaker Village was closed and sold. Only one Shaker building is open to the public, at Fruitlands Museum; the remaining surviving buildings are in private ownership.

Nationally, 19 Shaker communities had been established in the 1700s and 1800s, mostly in northeastern United States. Community locations ranged from Maine to Kentucky and Indiana. The Shakers were renowned for plain architecture and furniture, and reached its national peak membership in the 1840s and 1850s. The Shaker community's practice of celibacy meant that to maintain its population, it was always necessary to have new outsiders join. The improving employment opportunities provided by the Industrial Revolution would over the middle decades of the 1800s diminish the attractions of joining the Shaker community. Today, only one church "society" remains open, run by the last Shakers at Sabbathday Lake Shaker Village in New Gloucester, Maine.

Fruitlands

Amos Bronson Alcott relocated his family, including his ten-year-old daughter, Louisa May Alcott, to Harvard in June 1843. He and Charles Lane attempted to establish a utopian transcendentalist socialist farm called Fruitlands on the slopes of Prospect Hill in Harvard. The experimental community only lasted 7 months, closing in January 1844. Fruitlands, so called "because the inhabitants hoped to live off the fruits of the land, purchasing nothing from the outside world", saw visits from the likes of Henry David Thoreau and Ralph Waldo Emerson. Louisa May Alcott used her experience at Fruitlands as an inspiration for her novel Little Women.

Clara Endicott Sears, whose Prospect Hill summer estate, The Pergolas, restored Fruitlands and opened it as a museum in 1914. On the grounds of Fruitlands Museum there is also a Shaker house, which was relocated there from Harvard's Shaker Village by Sears in 1920. It is the first Shaker museum ever established in the United States. In addition, Sears opened a gallery on the property dedicated to Native American history. Sears became interested in Native Americans after Nipmuck arrowheads were found around her property on Prospect Hill, which the Nipmuck Indians had called Makamacheckamucks.

Originally, Sears' Fruitlands property spanned , but in 1939,  were seized by eminent domain for expansion of Fort Devens. As of 2010, that land is now part of the Oxbow National Wildlife Refuge.

Fiske Warren Tahanto Enclave

Fiske Warren, a follower of Henry George, attempted to establish a single tax zone in Harvard in 1918. The enclave bought up land (previously owned by the recently disbanded Shaker community) communally and attempted to manage the land according to George's principles. The enclave disbanded shortly after Warren died in 1938. His house was added to the National Register of Historic Places in 1996.

St. Benedict Center
Father Leonard Feeney was a Jesuit priest who held to a literal interpretation of the doctrine "Extra Ecclesiam nulla salus" (or "outside the Church there is no salvation"). Feeney was excommunicated in 1953. Under the direction of Feeney, Catherine Goddard Clarke and others organized into a group called the Slaves of the Immaculate Heart of Mary, an unofficial Catholic entity. In January 1958, the community moved from Cambridge to the town of Harvard. Eventually, the original community split into several groups: the Benedictines, the Sisters of Saint Ann's House and Sisters of St. Benedict's center, Slaves of the Immaculate Heart of Mary. A further split later occurred with some members of the Slaves of the Immaculate Heart of Mary leaving to establish a separate group in New Hampshire.
A branch of the Saint Benedict Center is located in Still River, on the west side of Harvard.

St. Benedict Abbey

In Still River there is an abbey of Benedictine monks that branched from the St. Benedict Center. There are six brothers and seven priests. They focus on reverently saying Mass in both the pre-Vatican II and the post-Vatican II forms and chanting the Divine Office in Latin. Their current abbot is the Right Reverend Xavier Connelly, OSB, who was elected June 16, 2010.

Geography

The town is largely wooded with small rolling hills, fields, and wetlands. In addition to the numerous streams and brooks throughout Harvard, Bare Hill Pond is a central, iconic locale.

Harvard and the surrounding area are renowned for apple orchards and riding stables.

Surrounding towns
Harvard is located in MetroWest, surrounded by the seven municipalities of Ayer, Littleton, Bolton, Boxborough, Stow, Lancaster and Shirley

Demographics

As of the census of 2000, there were 5,981 people, 1,809 households, and 1,494 families residing in the town. The population density was 226.9 people per square mile (87.6/km2). There were 2,225 housing units at an average density of 84.4 per square mile (32.6/km2). The racial makeup of the town was 91.69% White, 4.50% African American, 0.17% Native American, 1.97% Asian, 0.05% Pacific Islander, 0.50% from other races, and 1.12% from two or more races. Hispanic or Latino of any race were 6.09% of the population.

There were 1,809 households, out of which 44.7% had children under the age of 18 living with them, 73.4% were married couples living together, 6.9% had a female householder with no husband present, and 17.4% were non-families. 14.3% of all households were made up of individuals, and 4.3% had someone living alone who was 65 years of age or older. The average household size was 2.86 and the average family size was 3.18.

In the town the population was spread out, with 26.6% under the age of 18, 4.0% from 18 to 24, 29.5% from 25 to 44, 32.3% from 45 to 64, and 7.6% who were 65 years of age or older. The median age was 41 years. For every 100 females there were 124.7 males. For every 100 females age 18 and over, there were 133.6 males.

The median income for a household in the town was $117,934, and the median income for a family was $139,352. Males had a median income of $90,937 versus $49,318 for females. The per capita income for the town was $50,867. About 0.5% of families and 2.0% of the population were below the poverty line, including 0.7% of those under age 18 and 7.1% of those age 65 or over.

The decline in the population of the town of Harvard from the 1990 census to the 2000 U.S. census is attributable to the 1996 closure of Fort Devens, a U.S. military installation and the departure of military personnel and families residing at Fort Devens, which in large part is within the territory of the town of Harvard. The Fort Devens property has in large part been converted to civilian use, under the direction of MassDevelopment, a development authority of the Commonwealth of Massachusetts.

Government
The town elects five members to the Board of Selectmen to run the town day-to-day and has an annual Town Meeting to pass/amend the town bylaws and approve the town budget.

Schools

Harvard serves one public K–5 elementary school; the Hildreth Elementary School, and one public 6–12 middle/high school; the Bromfield School.

When the town constructed the current building housing the Bromfield School middle and high school, the town successfully resisted the Massachusetts School Building Authority efforts to regionalize its school system with other towns; the School Building Authority partially funds new school buildings and renovations. Harvard's Kindergarten through grade twelve school system ranks among the top 5% of schools in the state according to some authorities, and more than 97% of its graduates go on to college. The public high school, the Bromfield School, and the Hildreth Elementary School are both located in the center of town on Massachusetts Avenue Bromfield has its ranks in nationwide tests in the top 20 and HES has them for MCAS (Massachusetts Comprehensive Assessment System) in the top 5.

Library

The public library of Harvard opened in 1856. In fiscal year 2008, the town of Harvard spent 2.41% ($487,470) of its budget on its public library—approximately $81 per person and since then the library has undergone multiple renovations.

Notable people

 Amos Bronson Alcott, teacher, writer and Transcendentalist, Fruitlands founder
 Louisa May Alcott, novelist, daughter of Amos Alcott
 Cornelius Atherton, inventor and steel maker. Blacksmith, built muskets for the Revolutionary Army
 Peter Atherton, 18th-century colonial leader  
 Simon Atherton, early American Shaker who sold herbs in and around Boston
 Tabitha Babbitt, tool maker 
 T. A. Barron, author of fantasy novels
 Del Cameron, Hall of Fame harness racing driver and trainer
 Theodore Ward Chanler, American composer
 Adam Dziewonski, geophysicist
 Jonathan Edwards, musician
 William Emerson, minister and father of Ralph Waldo Emerson
 Fannie Farmer, cookbook author
 Donald Featherstone, created the plastic flamingo lawn ornament
 Leonard Feeney, controversial Jesuit priest and founder of St. Benedict Center
 Levi Hutchins, clockmaker, inventor of the American alarm clock
 Shadrack Ireland, religious leader
 Lynn Jennings, Olympic runner
 Charles Lane, Transcendentalist, Fruitlands founder
 George F. Lewis, proprietor of newspapers
 Keir O'Donnell, Australian-born actor, Bromfield Class of 1996
 Joseph Palmer, Transcendentalist; known for his beard
 Willard Van Orman Quine, American philosopher and logician
 Clara Endicott Sears, founder of Fruitlands Museum
 John Seccombe, religious leader, author
 Ted Sizer, educational reform leader
 Maurice K. Smith, architect
 Fiske Warren, supporter of Henry George's land value tax or single tax system
 William Channing Whitney, architect
 Gary K. Wolf, creator of Roger Rabbit

Houses of worship
 Harvard Unitarian Universalist (Unitarian)
 Harvard United Church of Christ (Congregational)
 Saint Benedict Center / St. Benedict Abbey (Benedictine)
 Saint Theresa, the Little Flower Church (Roman Catholic)
 Seeds of Faith Church

See also
 Harvard Ambulance Service
 Harvard Historical Society
 Harvard Center Historic District
 Frederick Fiske and Gretchen Osgood Warren House
 Harvard Shaker Village Historic District

References

Notes

Further reading

External links

 Official town website
 Harvard Historical Commission
 Harvard Public Schools
 Harvard Public Library
 Fruitlands Museum
 St. Benedict Abbey
 The Harvard Hillside Newspaper
 The Harvard Press
 The Harvard Post Newspaper
 Fannie Farmer House
 Shaker Historic Trail

 
Utopian communities in the United States
Populated places established in 1732